N8 may refer to:

 N postcode area district of north London
 Number Eight (disambiguation)
 Nokia N8, 2010 smartphone model
 N8 (Long Island bus), bus route in Nassau County, New York
 N8 Group of research-intensive universities in northern England
 N8, the molecular formula of octaazacubane
 N8, the molecular formula of a high pressure nitrogen form
 List of N8 roads
 LNER Class N8, a class of British steam locomotives

See also
N08, FAA identifier for Flanagan Field Airport in North Carolina